Anaplagiomus garnieri is a species of beetle in the family Cerambycidae, and the only species in the genus Anaplagiomus. It was described by Téocchi in 1994.

References

Tragocephalini
Beetles described in 1994